This is a list of the candidates running for the Marxist–Leninist Party in the 41st Canadian federal election.

Alberta - 5 seats

British Columbia - 13 seats

Ontario - 29 seats

Nova Scotia - 1 seat

Quebec - 22 seats

See also
Results of the Canadian federal election, 2011
Communist Party of Canada (Marxist–Leninist) candidates, 2008 Canadian federal election

References

Candidates in the 2011 Canadian federal election